XHPECD-FM is a radio station on 89.7 FM in Dolores Hidalgo, Guanajuato. The station is owned by Ciencia, Comunicación y Tecnología de Irapuato, A.C. and known as Magnética FM.

History
Ciencia, Comunicación y Tecnología filed for a permit station in Dolores Hidalgo on April 18, 2012. The social concession was approved on December 13, 2017.

XHPECD went on the air in December 2018 from a transmitter site west of town. It is a sister station to XHAWD-FM San Luis Potosí, which signed on in 2005.

References

Radio stations in Guanajuato